Farley Ledges,  is a bluff knob located on the southeast side of Northfield Mountain in eastern Franklin County, Massachusetts. The Western Massachusetts Climbers Coalition has been active in purchasing land to preserve access to the mountain; 2007 purchases included a parcel along Route 2 developed into a trailhead with a parking lot and access corridor to the ledges. The  Metacomet-Monadnock Trail ascends the wooded north side of the ledges where Briggs Brook Falls tumbles from the ridgecrest; a marked rock climbing access loop trail departs from the Metacomet-Monadnock Trail to traverse both the summit of the ledges and the extensive boulder field beneath.

Climbing access at Farley is an ongoing concern and the crag has faced closures by landowners in the past. Landowners have requested that no online or printed guides containing climbing route descriptions or grades are published. As a result, climbing at Farley Ledges is a social affair for new climbers who must seek out experienced locals for climbing information.

See also
Northfield Mountain
Metacomet-Monadnock Trail

References

Rock formations of Massachusetts
Mountains of Massachusetts
Climbing areas of the United States
Landforms of Franklin County, Massachusetts